Benjamin Daniele Wahlgren Ingrosso (born 14 September 1997) is a Swedish singer, songwriter and record producer. As a child, he appeared in the leading role in several musicals, and in 2006 he won Lilla Melodifestivalen with the song "Hej Sofia". He won the celebrity dancing TV show Let's Dance 2014, and has competed twice in Melodifestivalen in 2017 and 2018 respectively. He won in 2018 and represented Sweden in the Eurovision Song Contest 2018, with the song "Dance You Off".

Early life
Ingrosso's mother Pernilla Wahlgren is a singer, and his father Emilio Ingrosso is a restaurateur. He is a self-taught pianist and guitarist.

Career

2006–2013: Lilla Melodifestivalen 2006, singing and acting

Ingrosso has acted in several musicals and plays such as Nils Karlsson Pyssling. He won the Lilla Melodifestivalen in 2006 with the song "Hej Sofia", and he represented Sweden in MGP Nordic 2006 in Stockholm, where he placed fourth.

In 2007, he released the single "Jag är en astronaut", which his uncle Linus Wahlgren had recorded and performed in 1985. Ingrosso's version peaked at number 2 on the Swedish singles chart. The same year he participated in Allsång på Skansen along with his mother, and he also took part in the Diggiloo tour. Between 2008 and 2009, Ingrosso acted in the musical Hujeda mej vá många sånger. At the Eldsjälsgala in 2009, Ingrosso and Pernilla Wahlgren performed a medley of The Jackson 5 songs, translated into Swedish. In late 2009, he performed as Rasmus in the play Rasmus på luffen along with Markoolio.

In 2011, Ingrosso performed as lillebror in the play Karlsson på taket flyger igen at Göta Lejon in Stockholm. In February 2014, he announced that he had left the musical scene to focus entirely on music and songwriting. In October 2016, he released his first music single called "Fall in Love", which he performed at Nyhetsmorgon which was broadcast on TV4. He signed a record deal with TEN Music Group.

2014–2017: Let's Dance 2014 and Melodifestivalen

Ingrosso won the Swedish celebrity dancing TV-series Let's Dance 2014, broadcast on TV4, alongside his professional dancing partner Sigrid Bernson. He has participated in his mother Pernilla Wahlgren's TV-series Wahlgrens värld, which is broadcast on Kanal 5, since 2016.

Ingrosso participated in Melodifestivalen 2017 with the song "Good Lovin'", which he co-wrote along with Louis Schoorl and Matt Pardon. He placed fifth in the final.

2018–2019: Eurovision Song Contest and Identification

Ingrosso participated again in Melodifestivalen 2018, with the song "Dance You Off". The song was written by Ingrosso, Louis Schoorl, and K Nita. He qualified for the final from the first semi-final and finished in first place. He represented Sweden in the Eurovision Song Contest 2018 in Lisbon, Portugal, in the second semi-final qualifying to the final. In the final he placed seventh, receiving the maximum 12 points from the juries of eight countries. Ingrosso performed his song against a backdrop of LED lights, which changed color in time to the beat of the music. He wore a black leather jacket, black jeans and white trainers.

Ingrosso released his debut album, Identification, on 28 September 2018. He writes all his own music and also writes for other musicians including Oscar Zia, Molly Petterson Hammar, Dash Berlin and Isac Eliott.

2020–present: En gång i tiden and Playlist 
Ingrosso took part in the eleventh series of Swedish reality television show, Så mycket bättre, alongside multiple fellow Swedish artists including Loreen and Tove Styrke. On 15 January 2021, he released his second studio album, En gång i tiden. The album is entirely in Swedish and marks his first full album in the language. Speaking about the album on social media, Ingrosso stated, "I love and miss singing in Swedish" and that the inspiration for the record came from his "love for Swedish pop and all of the great Swedish musicians that’s been my source of inspiration since [he] was a kid". The second part of the album, En gång i tiden (del 2), was released on 16 April. Ingrosso's fourth studio album and second English-language album, Playlist, was released on 17 June 2022.

Personal life
Ingrosso was born in Danderyd, to former dancer now restaurant owner Emilio Ingrosso, and singer Pernilla Wahlgren. He is the younger brother of Oliver Ingrosso and Bianca Wahlgren Ingrosso, and older half brother of Theodor Wahlgren. He is the grandson of actors Hans Wahlgren and Christina Schollin, and nephew of actors Niclas Wahlgren and Linus Wahlgren. He is also a cousin of Swedish House Mafia band member Sebastian Ingrosso. He is of Italian descent through his father, and of Swedish and Italian descent through his mother. Ingrosso was in a six-year relationship with influencer Linnea Widmark; the couple broke up in March 2019.

Discography

 Identification (2018)
 En gång i tiden (del 1) (2021)
 En gång i tiden (del 2) (2021)
 Playlist (2022)

Tours

Headlining 
Klubbturné (2019)

Scandinavian Tour (2019)

Co-headlining 
Turné 2018 (with Felix Sandman) (2018–2019)

Cancelled concerts

Theatre
Nils Karlsson Pyssling
Hujeda mej vá många sånger (2008–2009)
Karlsson på taket flyger igen (2011)

Filmography

Awards and nominations

Gaygalan
Since 1999, the Gaygalan is a Swedish accolade presented by the QX magazine.

!
|-
| 2019
| "Dance You Off"
| Song of the Year
| 
|style="text-align:center;"|
|-
|}

MTV Europe Music Awards
The MTV Europe Music Awards was established in 1994 by MTV Europe to award the music videos from European and International artists.

!
|-
|2018
| Himself
|Best Swedish Act
|
|style="text-align:center;"|
|-
|}

Rockbjörnen
Rockbjörnen is a music prize in Sweden, divided into several categories, which is awarded annually by the newspaper Aftonbladet. The prize was first awarded in 1979, and is mostly centered on pop and rock.

!
|-
| rowspan="2"| 2018
| Himself
| Male Live Artist of the Year
| 
| style="text-align:center;" rowspan="2"| 
|-
| "Dance You Off"
| Swedish Song of the Year
| 
|-
| rowspan="3"| 2019
| rowspan="2"| Himself
| Male Live Artist of the Year
| 
|style="text-align:center;"|
|-
| Concert of the Year
| 
| style="text-align:center;" rowspan="2"| 
|-
|-
| Benjamin Ingrosso Fans
| Best Fans
| 
|-
|}

References

External links 

1997 births
Living people
Swedish pop singers
Swedish songwriters
Swedish child singers
Swedish people of Italian descent
Swedish-language singers
English-language singers from Sweden
Melodifestivalen winners
Eurovision Song Contest entrants of 2018
Eurovision Song Contest entrants for Sweden
21st-century Swedish singers
21st-century Swedish male singers
Musicians from Stockholm
Singers from Stockholm
Swedish record producers
Melodifestivalen contestants of 2018
Melodifestivalen contestants of 2017